Islamic studies refers to the academic study of Islam, and  generally to academic multidisciplinary "studies" programs—programs similar to others that focus on the history, texts and theologies of other religious traditions, such as Eastern Christian Studies or Jewish Studies but also fields such as (environmental studies, Middle East studies, race studies, urban studies, etc.)—where scholars from diverse disciplines (history, culture, literature, art) participate and exchange ideas pertaining to the particular field of study.

Carole Hillenbrand describes Islamic studies as "a discipline that seeks to explain what the Islamic world has achieved in the past and what the future holds for it."

Many academic Islamic Studies programs include the historical study of Islam, Islamic civilization, history of the Muslim world,  historiography, Islamic law, Islamic theology and Islamic philosophy. Specialists in Islamic Studies concentrate on the detailed, academic study of texts written in Arabic within the fields of Islamic Theology, Islamic Law, and the Qur'an and Hadith along with ancillary disciplines such as Tafsir or Qur'an Exegesis. However, they also often apply the methods adapted from several ancillary fields, ranging from Biblical studies and classical philology to modern history, legal history and sociology.

Overview
Scholars in the field of Islamic studies are often referred to as "Islamicists" and the discipline traditionally made up the bulk of what used to be called Oriental studies.  In fact, some of the more traditional Western universities still confer degrees in Arabic and Islamic studies under the primary title of "Oriental studies".  This is the case, for example, at the University of Oxford, where Classical Arabic and Islamic studies have been taught since as early as the 16th century, originally as a sub-division of Divinity. This latter context gave early academic Islamic studies its Biblical studies character and was also a consequence of the fact that throughout early-Modern Western Europe the discipline was developed by churchmen whose primary aim had actually been to refute the tenets of Islam. Today, academic Islamic Studies is usually taught and studied alongside or after an extensive study of the Arabic language, with named undergraduate and graduate degrees in Arabic and Islamic Studies existing at universities such as Georgetown University, the University of Exeter, University of Oxford, University of Leeds, SOAS at the University of London, Yale University and several universities in Holland and Germany, notably Leiden University and Tübingen University.

A recent HEFCE report emphasises the increasing, strategic importance for Western governments since 9/11 of Islamic studies in higher education and also provides an international overview of the state of the field.

History 

The first attempt to understand Islam as a topic of modern scholarship (as opposed to a Christological heresy) was within the context of 19th-century Christian European Oriental studies.

In the years 1821 to 1850, the Royal Asiatic Society in England, the Société Asiatique in France, the Deutsche Morgenländische Gesellschaft in Germany, and the American Oriental Society in the United States were founded.

In the second half of the 19th century, philological and historical approaches were predominant. Leading in the field were German researchers like Theodore Nöldeke 's study on the history of the Quran, or Ignaz Goldziher 's work on the prophetic tradition.

Orientalists and Islamic scholars alike preferred to interpret the history of Islam in a conservative way. They did not question the traditional account of the early time of Islam, of Muhammad and how the Quran was written.

In the 1970s, the Revisionist School of Islamic Studies questioned the uncritical adherence to traditional Islamic sources and started to develop a new picture of the earliest times of Islam by applying the historical-critical method.

Themes

History of Islam

To understand the history of Islam provides the indispensable basis to understand all aspects of Islam and its culture. Themes of special interest are:
 Historiography of early Islam
 History of the Quran
 Historicity of Muhammad
 Early Muslim conquests

Theology
 Kalam (Islamic studies of theology often include study of the traditional  science of Kalâm.
 Islamic eschatology

Mysticism

Sufism ( taṣawwuf) is a mystic tradition of Islam based on the pursuit of spiritual truth as it is gradually revealed to the heart and mind of the Sufi (one who practices Sufism).

It might also be referred to as Islamic mysticism. While other branches of Islam generally focus on exoteric aspects of religion, Sufism is mainly focused on the direct perception of truth or God through mystic practices based on divine love. Sufism embodies a number of cultures, philosophies, central teachings and bodies of esoteric knowledge.

Law

Islamic jurisprudence relates to everyday and social issues in the life of Muslims. It is divided in fields like:
 the study of sharia 
 Islamic economics
 Qur'an and Hadith studies  

Key distinctions include those between fiqh, hadith and ijtihad.

Philosophy

Islamic studies scholars also deal with the long and rich tradition of philosophy as developed by Muslim philosophers.

It is divided in fields like:
 Early Islamic philosophy
 Avicennism
 Averroism
 Islamic philosophy
 Modern Islamic philosophy
 Sufi philosophy
 Transcendent theosophy
 List of Muslim philosophers
 Illuminationist philosophy
 Islamic ethics
 Sufi metaphysics

Sciences

Islamic studies scholars are also active in the history and philosophy of science. Significant progress in science was made in the Muslim world during the Middle Ages, especially during the Islamic Golden Age, which is considered a major period in the history of science.
 Timeline of Islamic science and engineering
 Alchemy and chemistry in medieval Islam
 Astronomy in medieval Islam
 Islamic astrology
 Inventions in medieval Islam
 Mathematics in medieval Islam
 Medicine in medieval Islam
 Ophthalmology in medieval Islam
 Physics in medieval Islam
 Psychology in medieval Islam

Scholars also study the relationship between Islam and science, for example in the application of Islamic ethics to scientific practice.
 Qur'an and science
 Islamic creationism

Literature

 Arabic literature
 Arabic epic literature
 Islamic poetry
 Arabic poetry
 Persian literature
 Urdu Literature
This field includes the study of modern and classical Arabic and the literature written in those languages. It also often includes other modern, classic or ancient languages of the Middle East and other areas that are or have been part of, or influenced by, Islamic culture, such as Hebrew, Turkish, Persian, Urdu, Azerbaijanian and Uzbek.

Architecture

Islamic architecture is the entire range of architecture that has evolved within Muslim culture in the course of the history of Islam. Hence the term encompasses religious buildings as well as secular ones, historic as well as modern expressions and the production of all places that have come under the varying levels of Islamic influence.

Art

 Islamic calligraphy
 Islamic pottery
 Muslim music

Islamic visual art has, throughout history, been mainly abstract and decorative, portraying geometric, floral, Arabesque, and calligraphic designs. Unlike the strong tradition of portraying the human figure in Christian art, Islamic art is typically distinguished as not including depictions of human beings. The lack of portraiture is due to the fact that early Islam forbade the painting of human beings, especially the Prophet, as Muslims believe this tempts followers of the Prophet to idolatry.  This prohibition against human beings or icons is called aniconism. Despite such a prohibition, depictions of human beings do occur in Islamic art, such as that of the Mughals, demonstrating a strong diversity in popular interpretation over the pre-modern period. Increased contact with the Western civilization may also have contributed to human depictions in Islamic art in modern times.

Comparative religion

Islamic comparative religion is the study of the relationship between Islam and other religions.

 Islam and Christianity
 Islam and Jainism
 Islam and Judaism
 Judeo-Islamic philosophies (800 - 1400)

Economics

Islamic economics studies how economics may be brought in accordance with Islamic law.

 Islamic banking
 Islamic economics in the world

Psychology

 Psychology in medieval Islam
 Sufi psychology

Islam and Modernity
One field of study deals with how Islam reacts on the contact with Western modernity.
 Al-Nahda
 Islam and modernity
 Liberal and Progressive Muslim movements

Journals 
 Die Welt des Islams (Brill)
 Islamic Law and Society (Brill)
 Islam and Christian-Muslim Relations (Routledge)
 Jerusalem Studies in Arabic and Islam (The Max Schloessinger Memorial Foundation, The Hebrew University of Jerusalem)
 Journal of Arabic and Islamic Studies open access (Lancaster University)
 Journal of Islamic Studies (Oxford University Press)
 Hakeem Al Hind (Sree Sankaracharya University of Sanskrit Kerala, India)
 Al Mahara (Maharajas College, Kochin, India)
 The Muslim World (Blackwell Publishing)
 Studia Islamica (Maisonneuve & Larose)
 Pax Islamica (Mardjani Publishing House)
 Journal of Islam in Asia (International Islamic University Malaysia)
Al-Qantara (Spanish National Research Council)
Journal of Shi'a Islamic Studies (The Islamic College)
 Studia Islamika (Center for the Study of Islam and Society (PPIM) Syarif Hidayatullah State Islamic University of Jakarta, INDONESIA)

See also 
Arabist
 Glossary of Islam
 List of non-Muslim authors on Islam

Notes

References

Bibliography
 

 
Asian studies
Medieval studies by field